The 2016 Wagner Seahawks football team represented Wagner College in the 2016 NCAA Division I FCS football season as a member of the Northeast Conference (NEC). They were led by second-year head coach Jason Houghtaling and played their home games at Wagner College Stadium. They were  Wagner finished the season 6–5 overall and 4–2 in NEC play to tie for third place.

Schedule

Source: Schedule

Game summaries

Saint Anselm

Concordia (MI)

at Boston College

Sacred Heart

Columbia

at Central Connecticut

at Bryant

at Massachusetts

Duquesne

at Robert Morris

Saint Francis (PA)

References

Wagner
Wagner Seahawks football seasons
Wagner Seahawks football